Mark Thomas George (born 22 December 1977) is an Australian former cricketer.  Thomas was a right-handed batsman who played bowled right-arm fast-medium.  He was born at Ryde, New South Wales.

George played for the Kent Cricket Board in a single List A match against Derbyshire in the 2003 Cheltenham & Gloucester Trophy. In his only List A match, he scored seven runs and took a single wicket at a cost of 61 runs.

References

External links

1977 births
Living people
Sportsmen from New South Wales
Cricketers from Sydney
Australian cricketers
Kent Cricket Board cricketers